We Are The Problem is the 8th studio album by U.S. Bombs. It was released on April 4, 2006, on Sailor's Grave Records.

Track listing
 "We Are The Problem"
 "Don't Get Me Wrong"
 "Do It Again"
 "Revolution Weekend"
 "Heartbreak Motel"
 "4th of July"
 "Destroy The Nation"
 "Hammered Again"
 "Last Dischord"
 "Just Like You"
 "Locked In My Skin"
 "Guns Of The West"
 "Back Inside"
 "Tonight"
 "Cheers"

Line up for recording
 Duane Peters- Vocals
 Kerry Martinez- Guitar, harmonica, piano, banjo, bass guitar
 Curt Stitch - guitar
 Jamie Reiding- Drums

Additional personnel
 Doug Summers- Piano
 Andy Dahill, Zander Schloss- bass guitar

U.S. Bombs albums
2006 albums